Pseudoscourfieldia is a genus of green algae in the family Pycnococcaceae.

The genus name of Scourfieldia is in honour of David Joseph Scourfield FLS FRMS ISO (1866–1949), who was a British civil servant and biologist known as an authority on the Cladocera.

Species
 Pseudoscourfieldia marina(J.Throndsen) Manton, 1975

Also Pseudoscourfieldia longifilis  now accepted as Nephroselmis pyriformis

References

External links

Chlorophyta genera
Pyramimonadophyceae